Carter Jones (born February 27, 1989) is an American former professional road racing cyclist, who rode professionally between 2010 and 2016 for the , , , , and  teams.

Jones resides in Boulder, Colorado.

Major results
Sources:

2010
 National Road Championships
2nd Under-23 time trial
4th Time Trial
 5th Overall Redlands Cycling Classic
2011
 3rd Overall Tour de Guadeloupe
1st  Young rider classification
 4th Time trial, National Under-23 Road Championships
 9th Overall Cascade Cycling Classic
2012
 1st Stage 5 Tour of Southland
 2nd Overall Cascade Cycling Classic
1st  Young rider classification
2013
 1st  Mountains classification Tour of California
 8th Overall Tour of the Gila
 8th Overall Tour of Utah
2014
 1st  Overall Tour of the Gila
 7th Overall Tour of Utah
 8th Overall USA Pro Cycling Challenge

References

External links

American male cyclists
1989 births
Living people
Cyclists from Colorado
Place of birth missing (living people)